() refers to a number of influential art schools in France. The term is associated with the Beaux-Arts style in architecture and city planning that thrived in France and other countries during the late nineteenth century and the first quarter of the twentieth century.

The most famous and oldest École des Beaux-Arts is the École nationale supérieure des Beaux-Arts in Paris, now located on the city's left bank across from the Louvre, at 14 rue Bonaparte (in the 6th arrondissement). The school has a history spanning more than 350 years, training many of the great artists in Europe. Beaux-Arts style was modeled on classical "antiquities", preserving these idealized forms and passing the style on to future generations.

History
The origins of the Paris school go back to 1648, when the Académie des Beaux-Arts was founded by Cardinal Mazarin to educate the most talented students in drawing, painting, sculpture, engraving, architecture and other media. Louis XIV was known to select graduates from the school to decorate the royal apartments at Versailles, and in 1863, Napoleon III granted the school independence from the government, changing the name to "L'École des Beaux-Arts". Women were admitted beginning in 1897.

The curriculum was divided into the "Academy of Painting and Sculpture" and the "Academy of Architecture". Both programs focused on classical arts and architecture from Ancient Greek and Roman culture. All students were required to prove their skills with basic drawing tasks before advancing to figure drawing and painting. This culminated in a competition for the Grand Prix de Rome, awarding a full scholarship to study in Rome. The three trials to obtain the prize lasted for nearly three months. Many of the most famous artists in Europe were trained here, including Géricault, Degas, Delacroix, Fragonard, Ingres, Moreau, Renoir, Seurat, Cassandre, and Sisley.  Rodin however, applied on three occasions but was refused entry. Paul Cézanne applied twice but was turned down. Bernard was suspended for stylistic "errors".

The buildings of the school are largely the creation of French architect Félix Duban, who was commissioned for the main building in 1830. His work realigned the campus, and continued through 1861, completing an architectural program out towards the Quai Malaquais.

The Paris school is the namesake and founding location of the Beaux Arts architectural movement in the early twentieth century. Known for demanding classwork and setting the highest standards for education, the École attracted students from around the world—including the United States, where students returned to design buildings that would influence the history of architecture in America, including the Boston Public Library, 1888–1895 (McKim, Mead & White), the Supreme Court of the United States, (Cass Gilbert, Cass Gilbert Jr., and John R. Rockart), and the New York Public Library, 1897–1911 (Carrère and Hastings). Architectural graduates, especially in France, are granted the title élève.

The architecture department was separated from the École after the May 1968 student strikes at the Sorbonne. The name was changed to École nationale supérieure des Beaux-Arts. Today, over 500 students make use of an extensive collection of classical art coupled with modern additions to the curriculum, including photography and hypermedia.

Institutions

 ENSA École nationale des beaux arts de Dijon
 ENSA École nationale des beaux arts de Bourges
 ENSBA École nationale supérieure des beaux-arts de Lyon
 European Academy of Art (EESAB) in Lorient, Rennes, Quimper, and Brest
 ESADMM École supérieure d'art et de design Marseille-Méditerranée
 ENSA École nationale des beaux arts de Nancy
 École nationale supérieure des Beaux-Arts (ENSBA), Paris
 ESAD , Valence
 EBABX École supérieure des beaux-arts de Bordeaux

Notable instructors, Paris

 Marina Abramović
 Pierre Alechinsky
 Mirra Alfassa
 Louis-Jules André
 Antoine Berjon
 François Boisrond
 Christian Boltanski
 Léon Bonnat
 Duchenne de Boulogne
 Jean-Marc Bustamante
 Alexandre Cabanel
 Pierre Carron
 César
 Jean-François Chevrier
 Claude Closky
 Jules Coutan
 Leonardo Cremonini
 Richard Deacon
 Aimé-Jules Dalou
 Paul Delaroche
 Lin Fengmian
 Louis Girault
 Fabrice Hybert
 François Jouffroy 
 Victor Laloux
 Paul Landowski
 Jean-Paul Laurens
 Charles Le Brun
 Michel Marot
 Annette Messager
 Gustave Moreau
 Jean-Louis Pascal
 Auguste Perret,
 Emmanuel Pontremoli
 Charles-Caïus Renoux
 Paul Richer
 Ary Scheffer
 Louis Sullivan, American architect, left after one year
 Pan Yuliang
 Raymond Legueult
 Maurice Brianchon

Notable alumni, Paris

 David Adler, architect, American
 Wahbi al-Hariri, architect, artist, American-Syrian
 August Friedrich Schenck, painter, French/German
 Nadir Afonso, painter
 Mardiros Altounian, architect, Armenian
 Rodolfo Amoedo, painter
 Émile André, architect, French
 Paul Andreu, French architect, 1968 graduate 
 Théodore Ballu, architect
 Raymond Mathewson Hood, architect, American
 Frederic Charles Hirons, architect, American
 Edward Bennett, architect, city planner
 Jules Benoit-Levy, painting
 Étienne-Prosper Berne-Bellecour, painter
 Robert Bery, painter
 Alexander Bogen,  painter
 Wim Boissevain, painter, Dutch-Australian
 Maurice Boitel,  painter
 Pierre Bonnard, painter
 Jacques Borker, tapestry designer, painter, sculptor, French artist.
 Joseph-Félix Bouchor, painter
 William-Adolphe Bouguereau, painter
 Antoine Bourdelle, sculptor, French
 Louis Bourgeois, architect, French Canadian
 George T. Brewster, sculptor, American
 Bernard Buffet, painter
 Carlo Bugatti, designer and furniture maker, Italian
 John James Burnet, architect
 Alexandre Cabanel
 Paul Chalfin, painter and designer, American
 Charles Frédéric Chassériau, architect, French
 Alfred Choubrac, poster artist and costume designer, French
 Léon Choubrac, illustrator and poster artist, French
 Araldo Cossutta, architect, Yugoslavian-American
 Suzor-Coté,  painter
 Henri Crenier, sculptor
 John Walter Cross, architect, American
 Cyrus Dallin, sculptor, American
 Henry Dangler, architect, American
 Jacques-Louis David, painter
 Gabriel Davioud, architect
 Marie-Abraham Rosalbin de Buncey, painter, French
 Edgar Degas, painter, French
 Eugène Delacroix, painter, French
 Jenny Eakin Delony, painter, American
 Constant-Désiré Despradelle, architect, French
 Henry d'Estienne painter, French
 Félix Duban, architect, French
 Thomas Eakins, painter, American
 Pierre Farel, painter, French
 Ernest Flagg, architect, American
 Jean-Honoré Fragonard, painter, French
 Yitzhak Frenkel, father of modern Israeli art
 Meta Vaux Warrick Fuller, sculptor, painter, poet, American
 Fang Ganmin, painter, Chinese
 Charles Garnier, architect, French
 Tony Garnier, architect, French
 Adrien Étienne Gaudez, sculptor, French
 Théodore Géricault, painter, French
 Heydar Ghiaï-Chamlou, architect, Iranian
 Georges Gimel, painter, French
 Charles Ginner, painter
 Louis Girault, architect, French
 Hubert de Givenchy, fashion designer
 André Godard, designer of University of Tehran main campus
 Alan Gourley – painter and stained glass artist
 Jean Baptiste Guth, portrait artist
 Emmeline Halse, sculptor
 L. Birge Harrison, painter
 Thomas Hastings, architect, American
 Robert Henri, painter and teacher, American
 George W. Headley, jeweler, designer, American.
 Yves Hernot, Painting, photographer
 Auguste Alexandre Hirsch, painter, lithographer, French
 Mary Rockwell Hook, architect, American
 Henry Hornbostel, architect, American
 Richard Morris Hunt, architect, American
 Jean Auguste Dominique Ingres, painter, French
 Tove Jansson, painter and illustrator, Finnish
 Sadik Kaceli, painter, Albanian
 Mati Klarwein, painter
 Constantin Kluge, painter, Russian
 György Kornis, painter, Hungarian
 Gaston Lachaise, sculptor, French-American
 Victor Laloux, architect, French
 Charles Landelle, painter, French
 Jules Lavirotte, architect, French
 Paul Leroy painter, French
 Charles-Amable Lenoir painter, French
 Stanton Macdonald-Wright, painter, American
 Joseph Margulies, painter
 Albert Marquet, painter, French
 William Sutherland Maxwell, architect
 Bernard Maybeck, architect, American
 Annette Messager, installationist, multi-media
 Jean-François Millet, painter, Norman
 Yasuo Mizui, sculptor, Japanese 
 Gustave Moreau, painter, French
 Julia Morgan, architect, American
 Ngo Viet Thu, architect, Vietnamese
 Victor Nicolas, sculptor, French
 Francisco Oller, painter, Puerto Rican
 Ong Schan Tchow (alias Yung Len Kwui), painter
 Pascual Ortega Portales, painter, Chilean
 Alphonse Osbert, painter, French
 J. Harleston Parker, architect, American
 Jean-Louis Pascal, architect
 André Pavlovsky, architect
 Georges Petetin, painter, French
 Albert Pissis, architect
 Théophile Poilpot, painter, French
 John Russell Pope, architect, American
 Robert Poughéon, painter, French
 Fernand Préfontaine, architect and art critic, Canadian
 Edmond Jean de Pury, painter, Swiss
 S. H. Raza, painter, Indian
 Neel Reid, architect, American
 Pierre-Auguste Renoir, painter
 Arthur W. Rice, architect, American
 Gustave Rives, architect
 Cécilia Rodhe, sculptor
 James Gamble Rogers, architect, American
 Kanuty Rusiecki, painter, Polish
 Augustus Saint-Gaudens, sculptor, American
 John Singer Sargent, painter, American 
 Bojan Šarčević, sculptor
 Louis-Frederic Schützenberger, painter, French
 Georges Seurat, painter, French
 Joann Sfar, designer
 Amrita Sher-Gil, painter, Indian
 Nicolas Sicard painter, French
 Högna Sigurðardóttir, architect, Icelandic 
 Alfred Sisley, painter
 Clarence Stein, designer
 Yehezkel Streichman, painter
 Lorado Taft, sculptor
 Agnes Tait, painter, lithographer
 Vedat Tek, architect, Turkish
 Albert-Félix-Théophile Thomas, architect
 Edward Lippincott Tilton, architect, American
 Roland Topor, designer
 George Oakley Totten Jr., architect, American
 Morton Traylor, painter, American
 Guillaume Tronchet, architect
 Valentino, fashion designer
 William Van Alen, architect
 Vann Molyvann, architect, Cambodian
 Gisèle d'Ailly van Waterschoot van der Gracht, artist, Dutch
 Lydia Venieri, painter, Greek
 Jesús Carles de Vilallonga, painter, Spanish
 Carlos Raúl Villanueva, architect
 Lucien Weissenburger, architect
 Yan Wenliang, painter, Chinese
 Norval White, architect, American
 Ivor Wood, animator and director, Anglo-French
 Alice Morgan Wright, sculptor, American
 Marion Sims Wyeth, architect, American
 Georges Zipélius, illustrator, French
 Jacques Zwobada, sculptor, French of Czech origins

See also
 Académie des Beaux-Arts
 Architecture of Paris
 Beaux-Arts architecture
 Comité des Étudiants Américains de l'École des Beaux-Arts Paris
 Paris Salon

Notes

External links
 The Ecole des Beaux-Arts – Historical essay
 École nationale supérieure des Beaux-Arts – Official website
 École nationale supérieure des Beaux-Arts – History

 
Beaux-Arts
Beaux-Arts

Art schools in Paris
Schools in Paris
Universities and colleges in Lyon
Universities and colleges in Paris
Universities in Grand Est
Arts in Paris
Painting in Paris
Sculptures in Paris
1648 establishments in France
Educational institutions established in the 1640s
Ancien Régime French architecture

Historicist architecture in France
Neoclassical architecture in France

fr:École des beaux-arts#France